Cathetocephalidea is an order of flatworms belonging to the class Cestoda.

Families:
 Cathetocephalidae
 Disculicepitidae

References

Cestoda